Niilo Antti Johannes Yli-Vainio (February 23, 1920 in Alahärmä – November 16, 1981 in Spain) was a Finnish Charismatic leader. Several alleged healing miracles and other spiritual experiences took place at his revival meetings. As a result, thousands of Finns converted to Pentecostalism.

Niilo Yli-Vainio, who started preaching after having recovered from a heart condition during the 1950s, rose to fame during the late 1970s.

References

External links 
  Benjamin Ranta: Article "Stepping Stones - God's Warrior Niilo Yli-Vainio, The Great Finnish Revivalist. Published 4.3.2009, pages B 21–22, 34–35. ISSUU Strange Fire - The Voice Christian Magazine Volume V Issue 3.

Finnish Pentecostals
Converts to Pentecostal denominations
Finnish Protestant missionaries
People from Alahärmä
1920 births
1981 deaths